The B-Sides/The Conversation is a promo EP by the band The Afghan Whigs containing 4 cover versions and a two-part interview with Greg Dulli.

Track listing
 "Little Girl Blue"
 "Mr. Superlove"
 "Ready"
 "The Dark End Of The Street"
 "Conversation (Segment One)"
 "Conversation (Segment Two)"

References

The Afghan Whigs albums
1994 EPs